Alena Palmeová-West (born 7 January 1945) is a Czech former professional tennis player.

Biography
Palmeová born in 1945 in Jihlava. She married American William Sidney West on July 17, 1970, divorced 1984. After the wedding she played under the name Alena Palmeová-West.

Career
Palmeová won 11 international tournaments in singles and played in the finals in 19 tournaments. In doubles, he won one tournament and played in the finals in two tournaments. At Grand Slam level she was most successful at Wimbledon, making the third round of the Wimbledon in both 1969 and 1971.

Playing for Czechoslovakia at the Federation Cup, Palmeová has a win–loss record of 2–4.

Career finals

Singles (11 titles – 19 runner–ups)

Doubles (2 titles, 3 runner–ups)

References

External links
 
 

1945 births
Living people
Czechoslovak female tennis players
Sportspeople from Jihlava